Machon was a Greek playwright of the 3rd century BC.

Machon may also refer to:

People 
 Annie Machon (born 1968), British MI5 intelligence officer and whistle-blower
 Francisco Machón Vilanova, Salvadorean novelist
 Franz Machon (1918–1968), German submariner
 James Machon (1848after 1864), English-born sailor who served in the U.S. Navy and was awarded the Medal of Honor
 James Machon (skier) ((born 1990), British freestyle skier
 Martín Machón (born 1973), Guatemalan footballer
 Pablo Machón (active from 2006), Spanish activist for free software

Organisations 
 Bais Yaakov Machon Academy (AKA Bais Yaakov Machon), a former high school in New York City for Jewish girls
 Maarava Machon Rubin, an Orthodox yeshiva high school located in the town of Matityahu, Israel
 Machon Chana, a private religious college for Jewish women affiliated with the Chabad Hasidic movement located in Brooklyn, New York
 Machon Gold, an Orthodox Jewish girl's seminary in Jerusalem, Israel 19582008
 Machon Le Madrichim (AKA Machon L'Madrichei Chutz La'Aretz)
 Machon Meir, a religious Zionist outreach organization and yeshiva located in Jerusalem, Israel
 Machon Shlomo, an Orthodox yeshiva for men located in Jerusalem, Israel
 Machon Yaakov, a baal teshuva yeshiva for men located in Jerusalem, Israel

Other 
 Machon, a level of Heaven
 Mâchon, a traditional meal in Lyon, France.
 Machon Ayalon, a former underground bullet factory located in Rehovot, Israel
 Machon L'Madrichei Chutz La'Aretz, a young leadership program in Israel for high school graduates from all over the world, founded in 1946

See also 
 Machen (disambiguation)
 Machin (disambiguation)